George Halford Fellowes Prynne (1853–1927) was a Victorian and Edwardian English church architect. Part of the High Church school of Gothic Revival Architecture, Prynne's work can be found across Southern England.

Biography

Early life
George Halford Fellowes Prynne was born on 2 April 1853 at Wyndham Square, Plymouth, Devon. He was the second son of the Rev. George Rundle Prynne and Emily Fellowes (daughter of Admiral Sir Thomas Fellowes KCB DCL). His elder brother was the painter Edward Arthur Fellowes Prynne. George Fellowes Prynne studied at St Mary’s College, Harlow. He went on to Chardstock College, and thence to Eastman’s Royal Naval Academy at Southsea.

Career
In 1871, aged 18, Prynne he sailed America to work with a cousin who had taken land, and was farming in the Western states of America. But finding the work "trying and severe", after almost two years he travelled to Toronto was appointed to the role of Junior Assistant in the office architect Richard Cunningham Windyer.

Four years later, Prynne had gained a senior position in the office, and offer of employment from the architect George Edmund Street. He was employed by Street for a year, later working with architects Swinfen Harris, R.J. Withers, Alfred Waterhouse, and at the London School Board offices. He was a student at the Royal Academy between 1876 and 78. He commenced independent practice in 1879. Prynne became Architect to the Diocese of Oxford from 1913.

Prynne designed many parish churches in England, mostly in the southeast and southwest, and almost always on a grand scale of high church Gothic Revival architecture. He also undertook significant restoration work, and in all is said to have been designed or restored over 200 buildings. Examples include All Saints Church, West Dulwich and St Peter’s, Budleigh Salterton.

Prynne collaborated extensively with his brother Edward Arthur Fellowes Prynne who provided artwork for a number of the architect's churches. This includes St Peter’s Church Staines, which possesses Edward Arthur Fellowes Prynne windows of remarkable quality and beauty. Other examples include altar panels at Holy Trinity, Roehampton, and St Mary, East Grinstead, and a reredos at St Mary the Virgin Church, Hayes, where both brothers Prynne are now buried.

Family and personal life
George Fellowes Prynne married Bertha Geraldine Bradbury in June 1882 in Wandsworth, London. Prynne was a profoundly religious man with Anglo-Catholic convictions, and family prayers were said daily for the whole household. George and Geraldine Prynne latterly lived at number 3 Grange Road, Ealing. He designed St Saviour's Church, Ealing nearby on Grove Road, Ealing (consecrated in 1899), and was heavily involved in the life of its Parish. St Saviour's was demolished in 1940 following bomb damage, although the Clergy House designed by Prynne survives. Prynne also designed an extension to Ealing Town Hall, including a new octagonally towered entrance, built in 1930.

Prynne had seven children. Four of his five sons were in active service, two were killed in active service, which had a profound effect on Prynne's later years.

Works

External links 
George Fellowes Prynne, a brief biography

References

1853 births
1927 deaths
Architects from Devon
Gothic Revival architects
People from Plymouth, Devon
People educated at Eastman's Royal Naval Academy